Senator Burnett may refer to:

David Burnett (politician) ((born 1942 or 1943), Arkansas State Senate
John Burnett (judge) (1831–1890), Oregon State Senate
O. H. Burnett (1872–1906), Illinois State Senate

See also
Jacob Burnet (1770–1853), U.S. Senator from Ohio